Gamia abri is a species of butterfly in the family Hesperiidae. It is found in the Central African Republic.

Adults have been recorded on wing in June, July, August and September.

References

Endemic fauna of the Central African Republic
Butterflies described in 1997
Astictopterini
Butterflies of Africa